Barley Beach is the official GNIS name given to an undeveloped sandy beach on the Oregon Coast immediately north of Gold Beach in Curry County, United States. The beach is bounded by the Old Coast Road on the east. 
 
This beach is sometimes referred to as Bailey Beach which may indicate that the official name listed in the GNIS is misspelled or otherwise incorrect.

References

Beaches of Oregon
Landforms of Curry County, Oregon